Ajnabee, meaning "stranger" in Hindi, may refer to:
 Ajnabee (2001 film), a 2001 Bollywood film directed by Abbas-Mustan
 Ajanabee (1974 film), a 1974 Bollywood film directed by Shakti Samanta
 Ek Ajnabee, a 2005 Bollywood film starring Arjun Rampal and Amitabh Bachchan